In digital signal processing, long-term predicted excitation coding is a codec developed by Sony for voice recording. It is the standard codec in several Sony digital voice recorders. The codec is proprietary and no developer details are available as of early 2007. Typical file extensions are .DVF and .MSV .

References
Sony ICD-BM1 Digital Voice Recorder (Joshua Steward, voicerecognition.com)

Speech codecs